A hat-trick in rugby union, the scoring of three tries or three drop goals in a single match, has been achieved 55 times in the history of the Six Nations Championship. The annual competition, established in 1882, was originally known as the Home Nations Championship and contested between England, Ireland, Scotland and Wales. It was expanded to the Five Nations when France joined in 1910, and then to the Six Nations with the addition of Italy in 2000.

The first player to achieve the feat was Charles Wade, who was an Australian student at Oxford University when he was called up as a travelling reserve for England's match against Wales. When Philip Newton got lost on his way to the match, Wade was instated in his place. He scored three tries in England's 2–0 victory, which was the first match of the championship. At that time, a try by itself was not worth any points but allowed the team to try and kick a goal. George Lindsay scored five tries in Scotland's 4–0 win over Wales in 1887, the most tries scored by a single player in a Championship match.

Besides Lindsay, six players have scored more than three tries in a Championship match; of these Ian Smith is the only player to achieve the feat twice. He scored four tries in successive matches during the 1925 Five Nations Championship. Wales' Jehoida Hodges normally played as a forward, but after an injury to winger Tom Pearson during a match against England, Hodges was moved to the wing. Despite playing out of position, he scored a hat-trick in a 21–5 victory for Wales. As of 2017, the only forwards to score a Championship hat-trick while actually playing in the forwards are Michel Crauste; he scored three tries for France in their 13–0 victory over England in 1962 and CJ Stander; he scored three tries for Ireland in a 63–10 win over Italy in 2017.

Four players have scored a hat-trick of drop goals: Pierre Albaladejo, Jean-Patrick Lescarboura, Diego Dominguez and Neil Jenkins. No Italian has scored a hat-trick of tries in the competition, with Dominguez's hat-trick of drop goals the only one by an Italian player. English players have scored the most hat-tricks with 18, while France, Ireland and Scotland have conceded the most, with 12 each. Three players have scored a hat-trick and been on the losing side; Robert Montgomery in Ireland's 0–1 loss to Wales in 1887, Howard Marshall in England's 11–12 defeat to Wales in 1893, and Émile Ntamack in France's 33–34 loss to Wales in 1999. Lescarboura's hat-trick against England in 1985 and Jenkins' against Scotland in 2001, are the only times the feat has been achieved with the match ending in a draw. The most recent hat-trick was achieved by Blair Kinghorn (Scotland) against Italy on 18 March 2023.

Hat-tricks 

 All statistics are correct as of 6 February 2022.

Tries

Drop goals

Multiple hat-tricks

Player hat-tricks by their national team

See also
List of Rugby World Cup hat-tricks
List of Six Nations Championship Player of the Championship winners
List of Six Nations Championship records

Footnotes

Bibliography

References 
General
 
 

Specific

Six Nations Hat-trick
hat-tricks
Lists of rugby union hat-tricks